Pat Twomey (2 April 1929 – 22 November 1969) was an Australian rules footballer, who played in the Victorian Football League (VFL).

Pat Twomey joined Collingwood in 1947. He had two stints with the Magpies, separated by a spell with country club Warragul. Twomey mainly played across the centreline or on a flank and started as a winger. He was tough, fast and a tireless contributor in his appearances for Collingwood, a long driving kick and good mark he was one of a set of three brothers in the 1953 Collingwood premiership side. He played his last game for the Magpies on the wing in the 1953 Grand Final.

References

External links 

Australian rules footballers from Victoria (Australia)
Collingwood Football Club players
Collingwood Football Club Premiership players
Warragul Football Club players
1929 births
1969 deaths
One-time VFL/AFL Premiership players